Bulbophyllum hymenochilum is a species of orchid in the genus Bulbophyllum.

References
The Bulbophyllum-Checklist
The Internet Orchid Species Photo Encyclopedia

hymenochilum
Taxa named by Friedrich Wilhelm Ludwig Kraenzlin